Aaron Lopez (born 28 February 1983 in Mexico) is a Mexican former professional footballer who last played for Chivas USA in 2005.

Career

College
Helped the UCLA Bruins to the 2002 NCAA Division I Men's Soccer Championship title, their fourth-ever title in the competition, with a free-kick goal versus Stanford in the dying minutes of the game to make it 1–0.

Chivas USA
Featuring in 4 league games and starting three, registering 238 minutes, Lopez' time at Chivas USA proved ephemeral as he was released from the club alongside Alfonso Loera in August 2005.

Honors
All honors listed on his UCLA profile.

High school
CIF Div. III Defensive Player of the Year
 Channel League MVP
Athletic Round Table Soccer Player of the Year
Student Sports All-America selection

College
UCLA's Rookie of the Year: 2001
NCAA College Cup Offensive MVP: 2002
Honorable mention All-Pac-10 selection: 2002
UCLA's Team MVP: 2002
Second-team All-Pac-10 selection: 2003
First-team NSCAA All-Far West: 2004
First-team All-Pac-10 selection: 2004

References

Mexican footballers
American soccer players
Association football defenders
Living people
1983 births
American people of Mexican descent
Mexican expatriate footballers
Expatriate soccer players in the United States
Major League Soccer players
Chivas USA players
UCLA Bruins men's soccer players